Royal Naval Air Station Stretton (HMS Blackcap), was an airfield in the village of Appleton Thorn, though named for the neighbouring village of Stretton, south of Warrington, in Cheshire, England. Although the main runway remains, the northerly part of the airfield is now HM Prison Thorn Cross and an industrial estate. In the 1970s, the M56 motorway was built across the former air station.

The airfield was originally built in the Second World War for the RAF but when Luftwaffe tactics changed, it was surplus to requirements so command of the station was given to the Royal Navy in 1942. The airfield was used by the Royal Navy to ferry aircraft to aircraft carriers in the Irish Sea. Post war it was used as an aircraft maintenance, spares and disposal depot. After it was used by several RNAS squadrons in the 1950s, the air station was closed in November 1958.

Second World War

RNAS Stretton was originally planned as a Royal Air Force night-fighter station to protect Liverpool and Manchester from Luftwaffe air raids during the Second World War.  But changes in German tactics meant that the airfield was not required, so it was transferred to the Admiralty on completion; three runways and numerous hangars had been built.

HMS Blackcap was commissioned on 1 June 1942 and forty-one Fleet Air Arm Squadrons were based there for varying periods, some aircraft being flown directly to and from aircraft carriers operating in the Irish Sea and other nearby waters.

Fairey Aviation used two large A1 (aircraft production) hangars on the northeast edge of the airfield for the modification, repair and flight-testing of Barracudas, Fireflies and Fulmars before they were dispatched to their operational squadrons.  From 1944 HMS Blackcap was also used as an Aircraft Maintenance Yard, a large hangar complex being constructed to the northwest of the airfield for this activity.

On 31 May 1943 three WRNS ratings and three Naval Airmen were killed as the truck in which they were travelling lost control and overturned.  The Wrens were returning to HMS Blackcap after a local dance. Five of the deceased were buried by their families in their home towns, WREN Anne McCormick, aged 29, was buried by the Royal Navy with full military honours, in the graveyard of the local church – St Cross Church, Appleton Thorn. The Manchester branch of the Fleet Air Arm Association continue to celebrate the life of Anne McCormick in the annual remembrance service held at St Cross Church in June.

There are a total of 11 'war graves' in St Cross churchyard, of personnel from HMS Blackcap, including those of two Free Dutch Naval Officers serving in the Fleet Air Arm.

Post-war operations

At the end of the war American Naval Aircraft were flown into Blackcap to be broken up for disposal. The Aircraft Maintenance Yard meant that the airfield continued to operate and, at its peak, handled one third of all Fleet Air Arm Aircraft and all its spare engines.

In 1947 the Fleet Air Arm decided to form Royal Naval Volunteer Reserve Squadrons.  The first to be based at Stretton was 1831 Naval Air Squadron, a fighter squadron, which was reformed here on 1 June 1947, initially equipped with Supermarine Seafire fighters and a single North American Harvard trainer.

It was joined on 18 August 1952 by 1841 Naval Air Squadron, an anti-submarine squadron equipped with the Fairey Firefly.  Together, these Squadrons comprised the Fleet Air Arm's Northern Air Division which was formed at Stretton on 1 June 1952 and disbanded there on 10 March 1957 together with its constituent units.

767 Naval Air Squadron flying Supermarine Attackers was also based in Stretton. One notable incident included an Attacker FB Mk.1, WA535 which crashed on 5 February 1953 near Winwick, killing Commissioned Pilot RE Collingwood (aged 22).  A second fatal accident took place on 10 November 1955 in an Attacker FB Mk2 WP281 172ST which crashed near RNAS Stretton while avoiding a collision with a Percival Sea Prince.  The pilot was Lt Cmdr CJ Lavender DSC (aged 34). He is commemorated in the churchyard at Appleton Thorn.

The last squadron based at HMS Blackcap was 728B Naval Air Squadron, formed on 13 January 1958 to operate Fairey Firefly U.8 target drones.  The squadron moved in February 1958 to HMS Falcon, Hal Far, Malta.

The airfield was closed on 4 November 1958.

Units

A number of units used the site:

See also
RAF Burtonwood

References

Citations

Bibliography
Ferguson, Aldon. Cheshire Airfields in the Second World War, Newbury, UK: Countryside Books, 2008. .
 Smith, David J., Action Stations – 3 – Wales & the North-West, Patrick Stephens, Cambridge, 1981, 
 
 Williams, Ray. "The Navy's Northern Reservists: Part One". Aeroplane Monthly, December 1979, Vol. 7, No. 12. pp. 627–631

External links
 HMS Blackcap History
 HMS Blackcap pictures
 Control Tower pictures
 Anne McCormick pictures
 A differing account
 Supermarine Attacker WA535
 Supermarine Attacker WA535
 Supermarine Attacker WA535
 767 Squadron
 atidswell.co.uk

Buildings and structures in Cheshire
Royal Naval Air Stations in England
M56 motorway
Military history of Cheshire
Royal Air Force stations of World War II in the United Kingdom
Stretton
Military history of Merseyside
Airports in North West England
Defunct airports in England